Dead Reckoning is a 1947 American film noir starring Humphrey Bogart and Lizabeth Scott and featuring Morris Carnovsky. The picture was directed by John Cromwell and written by Steve Fisher and Oliver H.P. Garrett based on a story by Gerald Drayson Adams and Sidney Biddell, adapted by Allen Rivkin.

Plot

Leaving a church, Father Logan, a well-known ex-paratrooper padre, is approached by Captain "Rip" Murdock. Murdock needs to tell someone what has happened to him in the past few days in case his enemies get to him. A flashback follows.

Just after World War II, paratroopers and close friends Captain Murdock and Sergeant Johnny Drake are mysteriously ordered to travel from Paris to Washington, D.C. When Drake learns that he is to be awarded the Medal of Honor (and Murdock the Distinguished Service Cross), he disappears before newspaper photographers can take his picture. Murdock goes AWOL, follows the clues and tracks his friend to Gulf City in the southern United States, where he learns Drake is dead – his burned corpse is recovered from a car crash.

Murdock finds out that Drake joined the Army under an assumed name to avoid a murder charge. He was accused of killing a rich old man named Chandler because he was in love with his beautiful young wife Coral. Murdock goes to a nightclub to question Louis Ord, a witness at the murder trial. Ord reveals that Drake had given him a letter for Murdock. Murdock also meets Coral and Martinelli, the club owner. Seeing Coral losing heavily at roulette, Murdock not only recoups her losses at craps, but also wins her $16,000. For some reason, however, she is uncomfortable with the situation. When they go to collect the money in Martinelli's private office, Murdock accepts a drink; it is drugged. When he wakes up the next morning, he finds Ord's dead body planted in his hotel room. He manages to hide the corpse before police Lieutenant Kincaid, responding to an anonymous tip, shows up to search his room.

Murdock teams up with Coral. Suspecting that Martinelli had Ord killed in order to get Drake’s letter, Murdock breaks into his office, only to find the safe already open. Just before he is knocked unconscious by an unseen assailant, he smells jasmine, the same aroma as Coral's perfume. When he awakens, Martinelli has him roughed up by his thug, Krause, to try to find out the content of the coded letter. However, Murdock is able to escape from his captors when taking him back to his hotel; the police arrive. The flashback ends, and Murdock slips away.

Now suspicious of Coral, he goes to her apartment to confront her. She claims to be innocent, but finally admits that she shot her husband in self-defence. She went to Martinelli for advice and gave him the murder weapon to dispose of, but he has been blackmailing her ever since. In love with her himself, Murdock agrees to leave town with her, but insists on retrieving the incriminating weapon first, despite Coral's objections. He threatens Martinelli with a gun, eliciting some startling revelations. The club owner reveals that Coral is his wife. He killed Chandler (having learned the man had lied about having only six months to live) and framed Drake so that Coral could inherit the estate. Murdock gets what he came for and forces Martinelli to precede him out of the building. As he opens the door, Martinelli is shot and killed.

Murdock jumps into the waiting car and drives off with Coral. As they are speeding away, he accuses her of having just tried to kill him. When she shoots him, the car crashes. He survives, but she suffers fatal injuries. In the hospital, Murdock comforts her in her final moments.

Cast

 Humphrey Bogart as Capt. Warren "Rip" Murdock
 Lizabeth Scott as Coral "Dusty"/"Mike" Chandler
 Morris Carnovsky as Martinelli
 Charles Cane as Lt. Kincaid
 William Prince as Sgt. Johnny Drake (John Joseph Preston)
 Marvin Miller as Krause

 Wallace Ford as McGee
 James Bell as Father Logan
 George Chandler as Bartender Louis Ord
 William Forrest as Lt. Col. Simpson (uncredited)
 Ruby Dandridge as Mabel (uncredited)
 Ray Teal as Motorcycle Cop (uncredited)

Production
Dead Reckoning was originally intended by Columbia Pictures' production chief Harry Cohn as a vehicle for Rita Hayworth, a follow-up to the extremely popular Gilda. Cohn thought that the pairing of Hayworth and Bogart would be a guaranteed money maker.  However, Hayworth was in the middle of a contract dispute with Columbia, and refused to make the film, so she was replaced by Lizabeth Scott, who was borrowed from Paramount Pictures' producer Hal Wallis. Scott, an up-and-coming actress being promoted as "The Threat", was often compared to Bogart's wife, Lauren Bacall, as both were former models, and had deep, sultry voices.  Bogart was a loan-out from Warners as well, and was reportedly unhappy with being sent to Columbia at the height of his career, if only because Warners kept any extra money paid by Columbia over and above Bogart's usual salary.

Bogart had right of refusal over the director for the film, and picked John Cromwell.  Bogart and Cromwell had worked together in 1922 on Broadway in Drifting, a short-lived play by John Colton and D. H. Andrews, when Bogart was a very young actor and Cromwell, the play's director, cast him in his first bit part.

Bogart was responsible for Murdock's extended speech to Scott about men carrying women around in their pockets, taking them out when they were needed to have dinner with or make love to.  This idea was one that Bogart was known to espouse when he had been drinking.

The song "Either It's Love or It Isn't", sung by Lizabeth Scott, had words and music by Allan Roberts and Doris Fisher.

Many of Dead Reckoning'''s exterior shots were filmed on location in St. Petersburg, Florida. Other background and location shooting took place in Philadelphia, Pennsylvania; LaGuardia Airport in New York City; and Biloxi, Mississippi.

Reception

Critical responseThe New York Times gave the film a mixed review, praising Bogart as "beyond criticism in a role such as Dead Reckoning affords him", with "some of the best all-around dialogue he has had in a long time." However, it was less kind to his co-star, Scott, "whose face is expressionless and whose movements are awkward and deliberate." Although the actions of Bogart's character are not particularly plausible at times, and the plot was considered to be "rambling" with "a lot of things about the script ... that an attentive spectator might find disconcerting," the Times found that "the suspense is skillfully drawn out."Sterritt, David "Dead Reckoning (1947)" (article) TCM.comVariety magazine also praised Bogart and liked the film, writing, "Humphrey Bogart's typically tense performance raises this average whodunit quite a few notches. Film has good suspense and action, and some smart direction and photography ... Bogart absorbs one's interest from the start as a tough, quick-thinking ex-skyjumper. Lizabeth Scott stumbles occasionally as a nitery singer, but on the whole gives a persuasive sirenish performance."

In 2004, film critic Dennis Schwartz was critical of the film. He wrote, "This second-rate Bogart vehicle has the star depart from his usual tough-guy role, though he manages to get into plenty of the action. It plays as a bleak crime melodrama that is too complexly plotted for its own good ... There's some fun in watching the Bogart character romance the husky-voiced femme fatale character played by Lizabeth Scott, but not enough fun to overcome how unconvincing is the sinister plot."Time Out'' calls Scott "synthetic" but "alluring", and detects a "hint of self-parody" in Bogart's performance. It says that their "relationship never quite convinces, leading to a faintly embarrassing emotional climax." The film, according to the reviewer, "tries too hard to maintain its note of doomed noir romance," but is nevertheless "[h]ighly enjoyable".

References

External links

 
 
 
 
 
 Dead Reckoning information site and DVD review at DVD Beaver (includes images)
 

1947 films
1947 mystery films
American black-and-white films
American mystery films
Columbia Pictures films
1940s English-language films
Film noir
Films directed by John Cromwell
1940s American films